Dasylirion longissimum, the Mexican Grass Tree, is a species of flowering plant native to the Chihuahuan Desert and other xeric habitats in Northeastern Mexico.

Description

Cultivation
The drought-tolerant and dramatic plant is cultivated by nurseries for use in personal gardens and larger xeriscape landscape projects in the Southwestern United States and California. Dasylirion longissimum is hardy to

References

longissimum
Flora of Northeastern Mexico
Flora of Coahuila
Flora of San Luis Potosí
Flora of Tamaulipas
Flora of the Chihuahuan Desert
Garden plants of North America
Drought-tolerant plants